The Dai people (Burmese: ရှမ်းလူမျိုး; ; ; ; , ; ,) are several Tai-speaking ethnic groups living in the Xishuangbanna Dai Autonomous Prefecture and the Dehong Dai and Jingpo Autonomous Prefecture of China's Yunnan Province. The Dai people form one of the 56 ethnic groups officially recognized by the People's Republic of China. By extension, the term can apply to groups in Laos, Vietnam, Thailand and Myanmar when Dai is used to mean specifically Tai Yai, Lue, Chinese Shan, Tai Dam, Tai Khao or even Tai in general. For other names, please see the table below.

Name ambiguity 
The Dai people are closely related to the Lao and Thai people who form a majority in Laos and Thailand. Originally, the Tai, or Dai, lived closely together in modern Yunnan Province until political chaos and wars in the north at the end of the Tang and Song dynasty and various nomadic peoples prompted some to move further south into modern Laos then Thailand. As with many other officially recognized ethnic groups in China (See Gaoshan and Yao), the term Dai, at least within Chinese usage, is an umbrella term and as such has no equivalent in Tai languages, who have only more general terms for 'Tai peoples in general' (e.g., Tai Lue: . This term refers to all Dai people, not including Zhuang) and 'Tai people in China' (e.g., '), both of which include the Zhuang, for example, which is not the case in the Chinese and more specific terms, as shown in the table below. Therefore the word Dai, like with the aforementioned Yao, is a Han Chinese cultural concept which has now been adopted by other languages such as English, French, and German (see respective Wikipedias). As a solution in the Thai language, however, as in English, the term Tai Lue can be used to mean Dai, despite referring to other groups as in the table below. This is because the two main groups actually bear the same name, both meaning 'Northern Tai' (lue and nüa are cognate).

Although they are officially recognized as a single people by the Chinese state, these Tai people form several distinct cultural and linguistic groups. The two main languages of the Dai are Dai Lü (Sibsongbanna Dai) and Dai Nüa (Daihong Dai); two other written languages used by the Dai are Tày Pong and Tai Dam. They all are Tai languages, a group of related languages that includes Thai, Lao and Zhuang and part of the Tai–Kadai language family. Various dialects of the Tai/Dai language family are spoken from Assam, India to Taiwan, and Shanxi Province, China. The Dai people follow their traditional religion as well as Theravada Buddhism and maintain similar customs and festivals (such as Songkran) to the other Tai-speaking peoples and more broadly, in regards to some cultural aspects, to the unrelated dominant ethnic groups of Myanmar, Cambodia and Sri Lanka. They are among the few native groups in China who nominally practice the Theravada school of Buddhism. The term Tai in China is also used sometimes to show that the majority of people subsumed under the "Dai" nationality are mainly speakers of Thai languages (i.e. Southwestern Tai languages). Some use the term Daizurian to refer specifically to the sinicized Tai people living in Yunnan. The term is derived from the Chinese term 傣族人; pinyin: Dǎizúrén which is translated in Shan as တႆးၸူး taj4 tsuu4 meaning "the Tai who are in association/united".

Tai subgroups

Languages
Peoples classified as Dai in China speak the following Southwestern Tai languages.

Tai Lü language
Tai Nüa language (Shan language)
Tai Dam language
Tai Ya language or Tai Hongjin

Yunnan (1998:150) lists 4 major Tai language varieties.
Tai Lü language: 400,000 speakers in Sipsongpanna, Menglian County, Jinggu County, Jiangcheng County, etc.
Tai Nüa language: 400,000 speakers in Dehong, Gengma, Shuangjiang, Tengchong, Baoshan, Longling, Changning, Cangyuan, Lancang, Zhenkang, Jingdong, etc.
Tai Rui: 40,000 speakers in Jinping, Maguan, Malipo counties, etc.
Tianxin: 20,000 speakers in Wuding, Luquan, Yongren, Dayao counties, etc. Representative dialect: Tianxin, Wuding County

History

Early period 
In 109 BCE, the Han dynasty established the Yizhou prefecture in the southwest of Yi (modern day parts of Yunnan, Sichuan, and Guizhou). In the twelfth century, the Dai (called Dai-Lue or Tai-Lue at this period) established the Jinghong Golden Hall Kingdom in Sipsong Panna (modern Xishuangbanna). Jinghong was the capital of this kingdom. The population of the kingdom was over one million and recognized the Chinese as their sovereign according to local records. The king had political and economic power and controlled most of the land and local water system.

Yuan and Ming period 
During the Yuan dynasty, the Dai became subordinate to Yunnan (itself recently conquered by the Mongols). Hereditary leaders were appointed by the authorities among the minorities of the region. This system continued under the Ming dynasty and the feudal systems during this period allowed manorial lords to establish political power along with its own army, prisons, and courts. However, some Dai communities had their own aspects of class, political structures, and land ownership that differed considerably from other groups. Also during the Ming dynasty, eight Dai tusi (chieftains) controlled the region with each having their own economic and political power. Although Buddhism has had a presence in Yunnan since at least the 7th century, the Dai converted to Theravada Buddhism during the 15th and 16th centuries.

Qing and modern China 
The Qing dynasty kept the Yuan and Ming system intact but with some differences. The Qing had more economic power in the region and routinely sent officials to the area for direct supervision and control. This well-established system was only fully replaced by the Chinese government in 1953. 1953 also marked the end of the ancient ruling family that was in place since the Jinghong Kingdom. The last king, Chao Hmoam Gham Le (Dao Shixun in Chinese), then became the deputy head of Xishuangbanna prefecture.

Exodus
The original areas of the Tai Lue included both sides of the Mekong River in the Sipsongpanna. According to the Tai Lue, there were five city-states on the east bank and six on the west, which with Jinghong formed twelve rice field divisions with all twelve having another 32 small provinces. These were:

On the west bank - Rung, Ha, Sae, Lu, Ong, Luang, Hun, Phan, Chiang Choeng, Hai, Chiang Lo and Mang;
On the east bank - La, Bang, Hing, Pang, La, Wang, Phong, Yuan, Bang and Chiang Thong (present-day Luang Prabang). (These names are transcribed according to their Thai pronunciations not their Tai Lue (Dai) pronunciations. If transcribed according to their Tai Lue pronunciations they would be as follows: Hung, Ha, Sae, Lu, Ong, Long, Hun, Pan, Cheng Choeng, Hai, Cheng Lo, Mang, La, Bang, Hing, Pang, La, Wang, Pong, Yon, Bang and Cheng Tong)

Some portions of these Tai Lue either voluntarily moved or were forcibly herded from these city-states around one to two hundred years ago, arriving in countries of present-day Burma, Laos and Thailand.

Cuisine 
The staple food of the Dai people is rice. Dai people in the Dehong area mainly eat japonica rice.

Bamboo rice is a famous snack of the Dai people. It is made by putting glutinous rice in a fragrant bamboo tube, soaking with water for 15 minutes, and baking with fire.Pineapple purple rice is also a well-known Dai dish.

Raw, fresh, sour, and spicy are the characteristics of Dai cuisine. Dai people believe that eating sour foods can make their eyes bright, help digestion, and also help relieve heat. Sweet can remove fatigue. Spicy can increase appetite. Acid is considered the most delicious flavor in Dai cuisine, and all dishes and snacks are mainly sour, such as sour bamboo shoots, sour pork.

Tai Lue in Thailand
 
In Thailand there are Tai Lue in many provinces of the upper regions of Northern Thailand; these provinces are:

Chiang Rai: Mae Sai, Chiang Khong and Chiang Saen districts (a portion fled to Chiang Rung at the outbreak of the Ayuthian-Burman War)
Chiang Mai: Samoeng and Doi Saket districts
Nan: Tha Wang Pha, Pua, Chiang Klang and Thung Chang districts (the greatest number, fleeing from the Saiyaburi and Sipsongpanna regions)
Phayao: Chiang Muan and Chiang Kham districts (many in number)
Lampang: Mueang Lampang and Mae Tha districts
Lamphun: Mueang Lamphun and Ban Thi districts

Festival
The festivals of the Dai people are mostly related to religious activities. The main festivals include door closing festival, door opening festival and water splashing festival.

The closing festival is fixed on September 15 in the Dai calendar (the middle of July in the Gregorian calendar). The opening door festival, the time fixed in the Dai calendar on December 15 (the middle of October in the Gregorian calendar). In the two festivals on the same day, all of people will go to the Buddhist temple to hold ritual activities. People will offer foods, flowers and coins to the Buddha. The three months between the closing door festival and the opening door festival are the "close" time of the year, the most religious time of the year.

The Water-Sprinkling Festival is a traditional festival of the Dai people, meaning the New Year of June. The time is in the late June or early July of the Dai calendar (the middle of April in the Gregorian calendar). Held about 10 days after the Qingming festival, it symbolizes "the most beautiful day". The holiday usually lasts three days. In the early morning of the festival, the people of the Dai village went to the Buddhist temple to clean the figure of Buddha. After the ceremony of the Buddhist temple, the young men and women pour water on each other. Then groups of people marched around, sprinkling pedestrians as a blessing. These represent blessings.

Culture and religion

Religion 
The Dai are predominately Theravada Buddhists. Dai Buddhism also tolerated many pre—Buddhist animistic beliefs and practices. The Dai were animists before Buddhism became popular and their belief in natural spirits continues. Until very recently, every Dai village had at least one Buddhist temple while larger villages had two to five temples. Many of their Buddhist temples were destroyed during the disastrous cultural revolution. Parents commonly sent their sons (from 7 to 18 years old) to the Buddhist monasteries to become novices and to receive monastic education. The boys will stayed in the monasteries for three years or more while learning how to write, read, and practice the faith. Afterwards, most boys or young men would disrobed and returned to secular society while a handful of them will remain in the monasteries to become fully ordained monks. This education system has led to high literacy rates and knowledge of the Dai script among Dai men that today exceed 80 percent.

Very few Dai practice Islam. These specific Dai are often called "Parshi Dai" or "Dai Hui". Hui (Chinese Muslim) merchants from Dali and other parts of Yunnan settled in Xishuangbanna in the early 19th century. These settlers assimilated and intermarried with the locals which eventually led to the creation of a unique Dai and Sino-Islamic culture. The present Parshi Dai have a material culture identical to their Buddhist counterparts. They speak the same language, wear similar dress, have similar customs, rituals, and diet.

Literature and science 
The Dai have historically had a rich array of astronomical and literary works. The Dai have their own calendar that begins in the year 638 and have many astronomical books on calculating solar and lunar eclipses (most written in Dai script). Historical documents, legends, stories, poetry, fables, and children's stories are also plentiful.

Dwellings 
Traditional Dai villages are mainly located in bamboo plains near rivers or streams. Dai homes are usually built on stilts and some are square in shape. A few houses are two-story with the upper story being the living space and the bottom story as a storehouse. The bottom story can sometimes be wall-less.

Economy 
As an effect of living in a subtropical region, subsistence for many Dai include the use and growing of rice, coffee rubber, tea, sugar, and many types of fruits. The Dai also have a highly developed handicraft industry which includes weaving, oil-pressing, winemaking, and bamboo work. Since the 1980s, tourism has become a source of revenue for the Dai in Xishuangbanna in consequence of airports being built in Jinghong and Mangshi. The increase of infrastructure and living standards in the region has led the Dai to assimilate into the mainstream Chinese economy better than other minorities.

Marriage and women's roles 
Historically, marriage was mainly between members of similar social or economic class and polygamy was common among chieftains. Dai society has traditionally been patriarchal with women having low status and unable to inherit property. Girls (from age 7 or 8) were responsible for caring for younger children and domestic duties. When they became older, working in the rice fields to clear weeds, harvest, plant, etc. was included into their responsibilities. Today, Dai women and youth have more freedoms then they did in the past and some women (with access to education) have entered into professional careers like teaching or nursing.

Gallery

References

Works cited
Zhu, Liangwen (1992).  The Dai:  Or the Tai and Their Architecture & Customs in South China. Bangkok, Thailand, and Kunming, Yunnan, China: D D Books and The Science and Technology Press of Yunnan.
Les Dai de Chine: Zhongguo de Dai zu (in French), Jean A. Berlie, 136 pages, Paris, France, published in 1990.

External links
Photos related to Dai Theravada Buddhism
Site including information on some endangered Tai scripts
 Xishuangbanna Tropical Botanical Garden

 
Tai peoples
Ethnic groups in Laos
Ethnic groups in Myanmar
Ethnic groups in Thailand
Ethnic groups in Vietnam
Ethnic groups officially recognized by China